William J. Callahan is the Deputy Director of the United States Secret Service. He served as the Acting Director from March 4, 2017 until April 25, 2017.

Secret Service career
He began his career in the United States Secret Service in 1991 as a Special Agent assigned to the New York Field Office. He has since served in a variety of management level assignments which include: Assistant Director of Protective Operations; Deputy Assistant Director of Investigations; Deputy Assistant Director of Administration; Special Agent in Charge of the Detroit Field Office; Assistant Inspector within the Inspection Division; Assistant to the Special Agent in Charge (ATSAIC) of the Presidential Protective Division; and ATSAIC for the Office of Homeland Security. In April 2011, Mr. Callahan was selected for the Senior Executive Service.

Education
Callahan holds a Master of Science in Education from Johns Hopkins University and an undergraduate degree in Bachelor of Arts and Science from Manhattan College.

Deputy Director of Secret Service
He was appointed Deputy Director on December 29, 2016 and left August 3, 2019.

References

Living people
United States Secret Service agents
Johns Hopkins University alumni
Manhattan College alumni
Year of birth missing (living people)